McRobbie is a surname. Notable people with the surname include:

 Angela McRobbie (born 1951), British cultural theorist, feminist and commentator
 David McRobbie, Australian writer of television, radio and children's literature
 Michael McRobbie, the eighteenth president of Indiana University
 Peter McRobbie, American actor